Beyond Sorrow, Beyond Pain is a 1983 Swedish documentary film directed by Agneta Elers-Jarleman. The film won the Guldbagge Award for Best Film at the 20th Guldbagge Awards.

Cast
 Agneta Elers-Jarleman
 Jean Montgrenier
 Jörgen Herlofson
 Helena Samuelsson

References

External links
 
 

1983 films
1983 documentary films
Swedish documentary films
1980s Swedish-language films
Best Film Guldbagge Award winners
1980s Swedish films